St. Casimir Parish was a parish created for Polish immigrants in Warren, Rhode Island, United States. In September, 1908, St. Casimir's was established as a parish. Bishop Matthew Harrkins of Providence appointed Peter Switala its first pastor. It is one of the Polish-American Roman Catholic parishes in New England in the Diocese of Providence. The church was demolished and parish shut down in 2017 following faltering attendance, staff downsizing, and then-temporary suspensions of service due to building damage.

Church plans were drawn by architect Walter F. Fontaine and contractor Thomas Loughran. The cornerstone was laid on July 25, 1909, by Bishop Harkins and the dedication ceremonies were held on December 19, 1909. A large bell for the Church was donated by the family of Anthony Mikulski. In the year of 1910, the Rosary Society was organized by Father Peter Switala.

See also
 Catholic Church in the United States
 Catholic parish church
 Index of Catholic Church articles
 Pastoral care

References

Bibliography 
 
 
 The Official Catholic Directory in USA

External links 
Official site of the Holy See

Churches in the Roman Catholic Diocese of Providence
Polish-American culture in Rhode Island
Polish-American Roman Catholic parishes in New England
Warren, Rhode Island
Churches in Bristol County, Rhode Island
Roman Catholic parishes and churches in Rhode Island
1905 establishments in Rhode Island
2017 disestablishments in Rhode Island
Religious organizations disestablished in 2017
Religious organizations established in 1908